Dino Ballacci (24 May 1924 – 6 August 2013) was an Italian football player and manager, who played as a defender.

Playing career

Club
During his football career, Ballacci became one of the most representative players of Bologna F.C. in the Fifties. He played more than 300 matches in rossoblù.

International
In 1954, Ballacci made his only senior appearance with the Italy national team in a World Cup qualifying match against Egypt, which Italy won 5–1.

Managerial career
As a coach, he led Catanzaro to a Coppa Italia final in 1966; he gained a promotion to Serie B with Alessandria (1973), a promotion in Serie C with Pistoiese (1974) and another promotion in Serie C1 again with Alessandria (1981).

He retired in 1988.

Managerial statistics

Death
Ballacci died on 6 August 2013.

References

1924 births
2013 deaths
Footballers from Bologna
Association football defenders
Italy international footballers
Italian footballers
Serie A players
Italian football managers
Bologna F.C. 1909 players
Calcio Lecco 1912 players
A.C. Reggiana 1919 managers
U.S. Catanzaro 1929 managers
Catania S.S.D. managers
S.S. Arezzo managers
U.S. Alessandria Calcio 1912 managers
U.S. Pistoiese 1921 managers
A.C. Ancona managers
Italy B international footballers